Tension at Table Rock is a 1956 American Western drama film directed by Charles Marquis Warren and starring Richard Egan and Dorothy Malone. Wes Tancred (Richard Egan) is publicly vilified after killing a famous gunslinger who was a public hero. The same year this film was made Richard Egan would star in another western: Love Me Tender. That film would mark Elvis Presley's film debut. Despite Richard Egan being first billed in that movie, people went to see it mainly because of Presley, but at the same time would discover how good an actor Egan was and he would become a known actor.

Plot
After killing a man whom many thought was his friend, Wes Tancred is assaulted and immortalized in an uncomplimentary song about one man shooting his best friend in the back; when in fact Wes' friend was reaching for his gun to shoot Wes in the back as he started out the door. Wes leaves town and winds up working as a hostler at a Stagecoach Outpost. He adopts an alias and befriends the father and son who run the outpost. Three outlaws arrive with plans to rob the stagecoach when it arrives. The father is killed in a showdown with the three outlaws. Wes kills them and takes the boy to live with his aunt and uncle, who is the Sheriff in Table Rock. A reckless band of herders that are running a cattle drive come to town with revelry and kill a sodbuster. In court there is testimony presented that the murder was self-defense because the ramrodder had placed a weapon in the victim's hand. Both the Sheriff and Wes are aware of this; however, the Sheriff who was traumatized from a previous beating, states in his report, that it was self-defense. He revises his report when Wes steps forward with testimony to the contrary, challenging him to overcome his fear. Wes shoots down a hired gun that comes to town to kill the Sheriff and the Sheriff, in turn, shoots the man who hires the gunman when he attempts to shoot Wes in the back.

Cast
 Richard Egan as Wes Tancred
 Dorothy Malone as Lorna Miller
 Cameron Mitchell as Fred Miller
 Billy Chapin as Jody Burrows
 Royal Dano as Harry Jameson
 Edward Andrews as Kirk
 John Dehner as Hampton
 DeForest Kelley as Jim Breck
 Joe De Santis as Ed Burrows (as Joe DeSantis)
 Angie Dickinson as Cathy
 Lauren Chapin as Little Girl (uncredited)
 Charles H. Gray as Zecca (uncredited)
 Joyce Jameson as Singer (uncredited)
 Suzanne Ridgeway as Saloon Girl (uncredited)
 Jeanne Bates as Mrs. Brice (uncredited)

Production
Sterling Hayden claimed he had been hired for six weeks to appear in the film but RKO Pictures disclaimed the agreement so he sued them for $35,000. RKO settled out of court.

See also
List of American films of 1956

References

External links 
 
 
 
 

1956 films
1956 Western (genre) films
RKO Pictures films
American Western (genre) films
Films scored by Dimitri Tiomkin
Films directed by Charles Marquis Warren
1956 drama films
1950s English-language films
1950s American films